The Tromsø International Film Festival (TIFF) is an annual film festival held during the third week of January in Tromsø, Norway.

The inaugural Tromsø International Film Festival was held in 1991. TIFF has 5 screening venues, including one outdoor snow cinema. The total of admissions in 2020 it was 58500, which makes TIFF Norway's biggest film festival.

Movies with world premiere at Tromsø International Film Festival:
 2001 Cool and Crazy
 2008 The Kautokeino Rebellion
 2016 Doing good

Audience Award
Film voted as best movie by popular vote.
 1995 - Spider and Rose, directed by Bill Bennett (Australia)
 1996 - Accumulator 1 (Czech: Akumulátor 1), directed by Jan Svěrák (Czech Republic)
 1997 - Palookaville, directed by Alan Taylor (U.S.A.)
 1998 - Gadjo dilo, directed by Tony Gatlif (France)
 1999 - When the Light Comes (Netherlands: Waar blijft het licht), directed by Stijn Coninx (Germany / Belgium / Netherlands / Norway)
 2000 - Une Liaison Pornographique, directed by Frédéric Fonteyne (Belgium / France / Switzerland / Luxembourg)
 2001 - In July, directed by Fatih Akın (Germany)
 2002 - The Princess and the Warrior, directed by Tom Tykwer (Germany)
 2003 - The Sea, directed by Baltasar Kormákur (Iceland)
 2004 - The Return (Russian: Возвращение) directed by Andrey Zvyagintsev (Russia)
 2005 - As It Is in Heaven, directed by Kay Pollak (Sweden)
 2006 - Innocent Voices, directed by Luis Mandoki (Mexico)
 2007 - USA vs. Al-Arian, directed by Line Halvorsen (Norway)
 2008 - L'Orchestra di Piazza Vittorio, directed by Agostino Ferrente (Italy)
 2009 - Shooting the Sun  (US title: The Storm in My Heart) (Norwegian: Jernanger), directed by Pål Jackman (Norway)
 2010 - For a Moment, Freedom, directed by Arash T. Riahi (Austria / France / Turkey)
 2011 - Black Swan, directed by Darren Aronofsky (U.S.A.)
 2012 - Play (2011) directed by Ruben Östlund, Sweden 
 2013 - No, directed by Pablo Larraín, Chile 
 2014 - Of Horses and Men (Icelandic: Hross í oss), directed by Benedikt Erlingsson Germany/Iceland 
 2015 - The Salt of the Earth (Le sel de la terre) directed by Wim Wenders and Juliano Ribeiro Salgado France, Italy og Brazil 
 2016 - Rams directed by Grímur Hákonarson
 2017 - Sealers - One last hunt, directed by Trude Berge Ottersen and Gry Elisabeth Mortensen, Norway  
 2018 - Close-Knit directed by Naoko Ogigami, Japan
 2019 - Woman at war (Kona fer í stríð) directed by Benedikt Erlingsson, Iceland
 2020 - Parasite directed by Bong Joon-ho, South Korea
 2021 - Ninjababy directed by Yngvild Sve Flikke, Norway

References

External links
 Official Home page of Tromsø International Film Festival

1991 establishments in Norway
Film festivals in Norway
Winter events in Norway